Heterodontosaurinae is an extinct subfamily of heterodontosaurid ornithischian dinosaurs from the earliest to the mid Middle Jurassic (Hettangian to Bajocian) of Africa and South America. Currently, the basalmost known heterodontosaurine is Lycorhinus angustidens from the Early Jurassic of Cape Province, South Africa. Heterodontosaurines are small-bodied ornithischians  characterized by their cheek tooth crowns that are taller than wide, and jaw joint set below the axis of occlusion between maxillary and dentary teeth. Heterodontosaurinae was implicitly named in 1966 by Oskar Kuhn as he is the author of the family Heterodontosauridae. It is a stem-based taxon defined phylogenetically for the first time by Paul Sereno in 2012 as "the most inclusive clade containing Heterodontosaurus tucki  but not Tianyulong confuciusi, Fruitadens haagarorum, Echinodon becklesii."

References 

Heterodontosaurids
Jurassic dinosaurs of Africa
Jurassic dinosaurs of South America
Articles containing video clips